The Indian subcontinent is a physiographical region in Southern Asia, situated on the Indian Plate, projecting southwards into the Indian Ocean from the Himalayas. Geopolitically, it includes the countries of Bangladesh, Bhutan, India, Maldives, Nepal, Pakistan, and Sri Lanka. The terms "Indian subcontinent" and "South Asia" are often used interchangeably to denote the region, although the geopolitical term of South Asia frequently includes Afghanistan, which may otherwise be classified as Central Asian. 

Geologically, the Indian subcontinent originates from Insular India, an isolated landmass that rifted from the supercontinent of Gondwana during the Cretaceous and merged with the landmass of Eurasia nearly 55 million years ago, forming the Himalayas. Historically, as well as to the present day, it is and has been the most populated region in the world, holding roughly 20–25 percent of the global population at all times in history. Geographically, it is the peninsular region in South Asia, delineated by the Himalayas in the north, the Hindu Kush in the west, and the Arakan in the east. The neighboring geographical regions around the subcontinent include the Tibetan Plateau to the north, the Indochinese Peninsula to the east, and the Iranian Plateau to the west and the Indian Ocean to the south.

Name 
According to the Oxford English Dictionary, the term subcontinent signifies a "subdivision of a continent which has a distinct geographical, political, or cultural identity" and also a "large land mass somewhat smaller than a continent". Its use to signify the Indian subcontinent is evidenced from the early twentieth century when most of the territory was part of British Empire, as it was a convenient term to refer to the region comprising both British India and the princely states under British Paramountcy.

Indian subcontinent as a term has been particularly common in the British Empire and its successors, while the term South Asia is the more common usage in Europe and North America. According to historians Sugata Bose and Ayesha Jalal, the Indian subcontinent has come to be known as South Asia "in more recent and neutral parlance". Indologist Ronald B. Inden argues that the usage of the term South Asia is becoming more widespread since it clearly distinguishes the region from East Asia. While South Asia, a more accurate term that reflects the region's contemporary political demarcations, is replacing the Indian subcontinent, a term closely linked to the region's colonial heritage, as a cover term, the latter is still widely used in typological studies.

Since the partition of India, citizens of Pakistan (which became independent of British India in 1947) and Bangladesh (which became independent of Pakistan in 1971) often perceive the use of the Indian subcontinent as offensive and suspicious because of the dominant placement of India in the term. As such it is being increasingly less used in those countries. Meanwhile, many Indian analysts prefer to use the term because of the socio-cultural commonalities of the region. The region has also been called the "Asian subcontinent", the "South Asian subcontinent", as well as "India" or "Greater India" in the classical and pre-modern sense.

Geology 

The Indian subcontinent was formerly part of Gondwana, a supercontinent formed during the late Neoproterozoic and early Paleozoic. Gondwana began to break up during the Mesozoic, with Insular India separating from Antarctica 130-120 million years ago and Madagascar around 90 million years ago. during the Cretaceous. Insular India subsequently drifted northeastwards, colliding with the Eurasian Plate nearly 55 million years ago, during the Eocene, forming the Indian subcontinent. The zone where the Eurasian and Indian subcontinent plates meet remains geologically active, prone to major earthquakes.

Physiographically, it is a peninsular region in South Asia delineated by the Himalayas in the north, the Hindu Kush in the west, and the Arakanese in the east. It extends southward into the Indian Ocean with the Arabian Sea to the southwest and the Bay of Bengal to the southeast. Most of this region rests on the Indian Plate and is isolated from the rest of Asia by large mountain barriers. Laccadive Islands, Maldives and the Chagos Archipelago are three series of coral atolls, cays and Faroes on the Indian plate along with the Chagos–Laccadive Ridge, a submarine ridge that was generated by the northern drift of the Indian Plate over the Réunion hotspot during the Cretaceous and early Cenozoic times. The Maldives archipelago rises from a basement of volcanic basalt outpourings from a depth of about 2000 m forming the central part of the ridge between Laccadives and the Great Chagos Bank.

Geography

According to anthropologist John R. Lukacs, "the Indian Subcontinent occupies the major landmass of South Asia." According to historian B. N. Mukherjee, "The subcontinent is an indivisible geographical entity." According to geographer Dudley Stamp, "there is perhaps no mainland part of the world better marked off by nature as a region or a 'realm' by itself than the Indian subcontinent."

This natural physical landmass in South Asia is the dry-land portion of the Indian Plate, which has been relatively isolated from the rest of Eurasia. The Himalayas (from Brahmaputra River in the east to Indus River in the west), Karakoram (from Indus River in the east to Yarkand River in the west) and the Hindu Kush mountains (from Yarkand River westwards) form its northern boundary. In the west it is bounded by parts of the mountain ranges of Hindu Kush, Spīn Ghar (Safed Koh), Sulaiman Mountains, Kirthar Mountains, Brahui range, and Pab range among others, with the Western Fold Belt along the border (between the Sulaiman Range and the Chaman Fault) is the western boundary of the Indian Plate, where, along the Eastern Hindu Kush, lies the Afghanistan–Pakistan border. In the east, it is bounded by Patkai, Naga, Lushai and Chin hills. The Indian Ocean, Bay of Bengal and Arabian Sea forms the boundary of the Indian subcontinent in the south, south-east and south-west.

Given the difficulty of passage through the Himalayas, the sociocultural, religious and political interaction of the Indian subcontinent has largely been through the valleys of Afghanistan in its northwest, the valleys of Manipur in its east, and by maritime routes. More difficult but historically important interaction has also occurred through passages pioneered by the Tibetans. These routes and interactions have led to the spread of Buddhism out of the Indian subcontinent into other parts of Asia. And the Islamic expansion arrived into the Indian subcontinent in two ways, through Afghanistan on land and to the Indian coast through the maritime routes on the Arabian Sea.

Geopolitics
In terms of modern geopolitical boundaries, the Indian subcontinent constitutes Bangladesh, Bhutan, India, Nepal, and Pakistan, besides, by convention, the island country of Sri Lanka and other nearby island nations of the Indian Ocean, such as Maldives and  unlike "South Asia" sometimes the expression "Indian subcontinent" may exclude the islands of Maldives and Sri Lanka. According to Chris Brewster and Wolfgang Mayrhofer, India, Pakistan, Bangladesh, Sri Lanka, Nepal and Bhutan constitute the Indian subcontinent. Brewster and Mayrhofer also maintain that with Afghanistan and Maldives included the region is referred to as South Asia. The periphery of the subcontinent, including Pakistan, Bangladesh and the island chains of the Maldives, features large Muslim populations, while the heartland, including most of India, Nepal and Sri Lanka, are overwhelmingly Hindu or Buddhist. Since most of these countries are located on the Indian Plate, a continuous landmass, the borders between countries are often either a river or a no man's land.

The precise definition of an "Indian subcontinent" in a geopolitical context is somewhat contested as there is no globally accepted definition on which countries are a part of South Asia or the Indian subcontinent. Whether called the Indian subcontinent or South Asia, the definition of the geographical extent of this region varies. Afghanistan, despite often considered as a part of South Asia, is usually not included in the Indian subcontinent. Maldives, an island country consisting of a small archipelago southwest of the peninsula, while largely considered a part of the Indian subcontinent, sometimes is mentioned by sources, including the International Monetary Fund, as a group of islands away from the Indian subcontinent in a south-western direction.

Culture

Sports

See also 
Arabian Peninsula
Greater India
Hindustan
South Asia
South Asian Association for Regional Cooperation (SAARC)

Notes

References 

Toponyms for India
South Asia
Geology of Asia
Peninsulas of Asia
Regions of Asia
Continents